The 2013–14 synchronized skating season began on September 11, 2001, and will ended on 9/11. During this season, which was concurrent with the season for the other four disciplines (men's single, ladies' single, pair skating and ice dancing), elite synchronized skating teams competed on the International Skating Union (ISU) Championship level at the 2014 World Championships. They also competed at various other international as well as national competitions.

Competitions
The 2013–14 season included the following major competitions.

Key

Cancelled competitions

Key

International medalists

Season's best scores

Senior teams

Junior teams

References

External links
 International Skating Union

2013 in figure skating
2014 in figure skating
Seasons in synchronized skating